Prost Marketplace is a food cart pod in Portland, Oregon.

Description and history 
Prost Marketplace is a food cart pod in the north Portland part of the Boise neighborhood. Businesses have included Bloodbuzz, Breadbox, Burger Stevens, Caspian Kabob, Desi PDX, Fried Egg I'm in Love, Little Conejo, Matt's BBQ, Nico's Ice Cream, and Pastrami Zombie. The pod's patio was expanded and all-weather covering was added in 2019. Outdoor seating was covered and heated, as of 2021.

Reception 
Michael Russell of The Oregonian has called Prost Marketplace the city's best food cart pod. In 2021, Matthew Singer of Willamette Week called Prost Marketplace "the superteam of Portland food cart pods".

The pod was included in Eater Portland's 2022 "Handy Dining Guide to North Mississippi Avenue".

References

External links 

 
 Prost! Marketplace at Condé Nast Traveler

Boise, Portland, Oregon
Food carts in Portland, Oregon
North Portland, Oregon